Stigmella microtheriella is a moth of the family Nepticulidae, found in Asia, Europe and New Zealand. The larvae mine the leaves of hazel (Corylus species) and hornbeams (Carpinus species). It was described by the English entomologist, Henry Tibbats Stainton in 1854 from a type specimen found in England.

Description
The wingspan is .The head is ochreous-yellowish, collar ochreous-whitish. Antennal eyecaps ochreous-whitish. Forewings purplish-fuscous ; a rather oblique shining whitish fascia beyond middle ; apical area beyond this darker and more purple. Hindwings grey. Adults are on wing in May and again in August. The moths are parthenogenetic.

Egg
Laid on the underside of a leaf, usually near a rib on hazel (Corylus avellana) and sometimes hornbeam (Carpinus betulus). Other recorded host are Oriental hornbeam (Carpinus orientalis), Turkish hazel (Corylus colurna), the filbert (Corylus maxima), European hop-hornbeam (Ostrya carpinifolia) and American hophornbeam (Ostrya virginiana). 

Larvae
Yellow with a bright green gut; the head is light brown. They feed venter (belly) upwards. The mines are narrow and often angular and the linear frass fills less than half of the mine. The mine widens gradually but is never wider than the width of the larva. In the later stages the frass is dispersed and irregular, filling about two-thirds of the mine. Sometimes there can be several larvae mining the same leaf.

Cocoon
Yellowish brown or pinkish on the ground.

Distribution
It is found in all of Europe. It is also present in the eastern Palearctic realm and the Australasian realm, where it is found in New Zealand (it was introduced here from Britain around 1850).

Etymology
The moth was described by Stainton from a specimen found in England, and he assigned the moth to the genus Nepticula, from neptis – a granddaughter; potentially the smallest member of a family and referring to the moths small size. It was later moved to the genus Stigmella. Stigma – ″a brand, a small spot″, from the moths small size, or more likely from a conspicuous, sometimes metallic, fascia on the wings of many of the moths in the genus. When described, the moth was thought to be the smallest, hence microtheriella; micros – small and therion – a little creature.

References

External links
 Swedish moths
 Stigmella microtheriella images at  Consortium for the Barcode of Life
 Fauna of New Zealand – Number 16: Nepticulidae (Insecta: Lepidoptera)

Nepticulidae
Leaf miners
Moths described in 1854
Moths of Asia
Moths of Europe
Moths of New Zealand
Taxa named by Henry Tibbats Stainton